Carex poculisquama is a tussock-forming perennial in the family Cyperaceae. It is native to eastern parts of Asia.

See also
 List of Carex species

References

poculisquama
Plants described in 1929
Taxa named by Georg Kükenthal
Flora of China
Flora of Japan
Flora of Korea